Josse-François-Joseph Benaut (c. 1743 in Gullegem – 13 July 1794, Paris) was a Flemish composer, organist, harpsichordist, music educator and priest who had a career in France.

Life
His father Charles Benaut was an organist in Wulveringen in Flanders.  Josse-François-Joseph Benaut set himself up in Paris as a harpsichord tutor and in 1771 married the daughter of a Flemish merchant.

He was guillotined during the French Revolution on what is now Place de la Nation, Paris as he was suspected of being in contact with the rebels of the Vendée.

External links
 

1743 births
1794 deaths
18th-century composers
18th-century male musicians
18th-century musicians
18th-century keyboardists
Flemish composers
Male composers
Flemish harpsichordists
Flemish musicians
Flemish organists
Male organists
Music educators
People from Wevelgem
Flemish priests
People of the French Revolution
People executed by guillotine during the French Revolution